French Polynesia is competing at the 2013 World Aquatics Championships in Barcelona, Spain between 19 July and 4 August 2013.

Swimming

Men

External links
Barcelona 2013 Official Site

Nations at the 2013 World Aquatics Championships
2013 in French Polynesian sport
French Polynesia at the World Aquatics Championships